Durlești is a town in Chișinău municipality, Moldova. Durlești locality, located in the North-West part of Chisinau, is the largest of the suburbs of the capital. According to the results of the 2014 census, the city proper had a population of 17,210.

Notable people
 Vladimir Bodescu
 Petru Buburuz

International relations

Twin towns – Sister cities 
Durlești is twinned with:

  Blaj, Romania

References

Cities and towns in Chișinău Municipality
Cities and towns in Moldova